Ceracanthia is a genus of snout moths. It was described by Émile Louis Ragonot in 1893.

Species
Ceracanthia alturasiana (Neunzig & Solis, 2002)
Ceracanthia cornuta (Neunzig & Solis, 2002)
Ceracanthia eugenieae (Neunzig & Solis, 2002)
Ceracanthia frustrator (Heinrich, 1956)
Ceracanthia mamella (Dyar, 1919)
Ceracanthia pseudopeterseni (Neunzig & Solis, 2002)
Ceracanthia schausi (Heinrich, 1956)
Ceracanthia soraella (Druce, 1899)
Ceracanthia squamifera (Heinrich, 1956)
Ceracanthia squamimagna (Neunzig & Solis, 2002)
Ceracanthia vepreculella (Ragonot, 1893)

References

Phycitinae
Taxa named by Émile Louis Ragonot
Pyralidae genera